Nebijan Muhmet (born 10 July 2001) is a Chinese footballer currently playing as a left winger or left-back for Beijing Guoan.

Club career
Nebijan Muhmet was promoted to the senior team of Beijing Guoan within the 2021 Chinese Super League season. He would be given an opportunity to participate within senior games when he was part of the AFC Champions League squad, which was a mix of reserves and youth players to participate within centralized venues while the clubs senior players were still dealing with self-isolating measures due to COVID-19. He would make his debut in a AFC Champions League game on 26 June 2021 against United City F.C. in a 1-1 draw. On 13 June 2022, he would make his league debut against Tianjin Jinmen Tiger F.C. in a 1-0 victory.

Career statistics
.

References

External links

2001 births
Living people
Chinese footballers
China youth international footballers
Uyghur sportspeople
Footballers from Xinjiang
Association football midfielders
Beijing Guoan F.C. players